The 2022 LTP Charleston Pro Tennis 2 was a professional tennis tournament played on outdoor clay courts. It was the seventh edition of the tournament which was part of the 2022 ITF Women's World Tennis Tour. It took place in Charleston, South Carolina, United States between 27 June and 3 July 2022.

Champions

Singles

  Carol Zhao def.  Himeno Sakatsume, 3–6, 6–4, 6–4

Doubles

  Alycia Parks /  Sachia Vickery def.  Tímea Babos /  Marcela Zacarías, 6–4, 5–7, [10–5]

Singles main draw entrants

Seeds

 1 Rankings are as of 20 June 2022.

Other entrants
The following players received wildcards into the singles main draw:
  Jessie Aney
  Dalayna Hewitt
  Katarina Jokić

The following player received entry using a protected ranking:
  Emiliana Arango

The following players received entry from the qualifying draw:
  Riya Bhatia
  Maegan Manasse
  Rasheeda McAdoo
  Erica Oosterhout
  Christina Rosca
  Himeno Sakatsume
  Chanelle Van Nguyen
  Noelia Zeballos

References

External links
 2022 LTP Charleston Pro Tennis 2 at ITFtennis.com
 Official website

2022 ITF Women's World Tennis Tour
2022 in American tennis
June 2022 sports events in the United States
July 2022 sports events in the United States